Meroles cuneirostris, the wedge-snouted sand lizard or wedge-snouted desert lizard, is a species of sand-dwelling lizard in the family Lacertidae. It occurs in the Namib Desert of Namibia and South Africa.

References

Meroles
Reptiles of Namibia
Reptiles of South Africa
Reptiles described in 1867
Taxa named by Alexander Strauch